Tēvita Chris Satae (born 22 October 1992), anglicised David Chris Satae is a Tongan professional rugby league footballer who plays as a  or  forward for Hull F.C. in the Betfred Super League.

Satae played for the New Zealand Warriors in the National Rugby League.

Background
Satae was born in Tofoa, Tonga.

Early career
After playing rugby league at St Paul's College, Satae signed with the Penrith Panthers and played in their 2012 National Youth Competition side. Satae also played rugby union for the Ponsonby Rugby Club.

Satae played in the Auckland Rugby League competition for the Glenora Bears and the Point Chevalier Pirates. He represented the Akarana Falcons and the New Zealand Residents in 2016.

Playing career

New Zealand Warriors
He then signed with the New Zealand Warriors and played in their 2017 Intrust Super Premiership NSW side. On 31 March 2017 his contract was upgraded to a NRL squad contract.

Later that year, In Round 20 of the 2017 NRL season, Satae made his NRL debut for the New Zealand Warriors against the North Queensland Cowboys.

Hull FC
On 5 August 2019, it was announced that Satae was granted a release effective immediately from the remainder of his contract, to take up a contract in Super League with Hull F.C.

He played 16 games for Hull F.C. in the 2020 Super League season including the club's semi-final defeat against Wigan.

Representative
On 25 June 2021 he was selected for the Combined Nations All Stars for their match against England, staged at the Halliwell Jones Stadium, Warrington, as part of England's 2021 Rugby League World Cup preparation.

References

External links
New Zealand Warriors profile
SL profile

1992 births
Living people
Combined Nationalities rugby league team players
Glenora Bears players
Hull F.C. players
New Zealand sportspeople of Tongan descent
New Zealand rugby league players
New Zealand Warriors players
People educated at St Paul's College, Auckland
Point Chevalier Pirates players
Rugby league props
Rugby league second-rows
Tongan rugby league players
Tongan sportspeople